This is a list of foreign players in the Thai League 1, which commenced play in 1996.

The List includes players from 1996 to 2021-22. Players of the current season are also included. All following players have played at least one Thai League game.

National flag before the name: players who have represented their national football senior team in FIFA International Match and have at least one international appearance cap.
In bold: players who have played at least one Thai League game in the current season (2021–22), and are still at the clubs for which they have played. This does not include current players of a Thai League club who have not played a Thai League game in the current season.
As for dual citizen, nationality is listed under official registration.
The list of players by country is sorted by the year of transfer in.
The country that has more than 20 players played in Thai League will be categorized by year of transfer in.

Naturalized Players
 Alexander Sieghart – Buriram United, Bangkok United, Police Tero 2016–
 Anthonio Sanjairag – Chonburi 2021–
 Anthony Ampaipitakwong – Buriram United, Bangkok United 2012–2021
 August Gustafsson Lohaprasert – Buriram United, Army United 2014–2015
 Bill Sida – Nakhon Ratchasima, Bangkok Glass 2015–2017
 Charyl Chappuis – Buriram United, Suphanburi, Muangthong United, Port 2013–
 Chitchanok Xaysensourinthone – Buriram United, Muangthong United, BEC Tero Sasana, PTT Rayong, Suphanburi, Nakhon Ratchasima, BG Pathum United 2012–2017, 2019–
 David Wilhelmsen – Ubon United 2017
 Delvin Pinheiro Frederico – Buriram United, Chainat Hornbill 2017–2018
 Dennis Buschening – Buriram United, BEC Tero Sasana, Army United, Navy, Chainat Hornbill 2013–2016, 2019
 Elias Dolah – Port 2017–
 Ernesto Amantegui – Buriram United, Army United, Bangkok United, Port, Muangthong United, Samut Prakan City, BG Pathum United 2013–
 Jack Krause – Sukhothai 2019
 Kevin Deeromram – Ratchaburi Mitr Phol, Port 2017–
 Kevin Sangsamanan – Buriram United, Chiang Rai United 2018–2019
 Leon James – Ratchaburi Mitr Phol, Sukhothai, Nongbua Pitchaya 2020–
 Manuel Bihr – Bangkok United 2016–
 Marco Ballini – Chainat Hornbill, Muangthong United, Chiangrai United 2018–
 Mika Chunuonsee – Muangthong United, BEC Tero Sasana, Suphanburi, Bangkok United 2009–
 Niran Hansson – Port, Police Tero, Chonburi, Buriram United, Nongbua Pitchaya 2017–
 Naruphon Putsorn – Bangkok United, Songkhla United, BBCU, Buriram United, Suphanburi, Nakhon Ratchasima 2013–2019
 Nont Muangngam – Chiangrai United, Police Tero, Chiangmai, Chiangmai United, Lamphun Warriors 2016–2020, 2021–
 Oscar Kahl – Bangkok United, Rayong 2017–2019, 2020
 Patrick Bentley – Port 2017
 Peter Läng – Bangkok Glass 2010–2013
 Philip Roller – Ratchaburi Mitr Phol,  Port - 2017–
 Robin Holm – Bangkok Glass 2018
 Ronan Pluijnen – Muangthong United 2022–
 Sammy Slot – Port 2018
 Suelong Sae-Ma – Buriram United, Army United, BBCU, Thai Honda 2011–2015
 Sujinda Dangvan – BEC Tero Sasana, Ubon United, BEC Tero Sasana 2012–2018
 Tristan Do – BEC Tero Sasana, Muangthong United, Bangkok United 2014–
 Yayar Kunath – Nakhon Ratchasima 2018–2019

Afghanistan 
 Faysal Shayesteh – Songkhla United – 2014
 Mustafa Azadzoy – Chiangrai United, Chiangmai, Trat – 2017, 2019, 2020–2021

Algeria 
  Khaled Kharroubi – BEC Tero Sasana, Osotspa Saraburi – 2011–12
 Otman Djellilahine – BEC Tero Sasana – 2014

Angola
 Aguinaldo – Ubon UMT United  – 2018
Altino Brandão – Stock Exchange of Thailand  – 1996

Argentina 
 Bernardo Cuesta – Buriram United – 2020
 Daniel Blanco – Army United – 2012–14
 German Pacheco – Ratchaburi – 2016
 Leandro Torres – Buriram United – 2014
 Leonel Altobelli – Buriram United – 2014
Lucas Daniel Echenique – Huai Thalaeng United, Samutsongkhram, Sisaket – 2011–2014
 Mariano Berriex – Ubon UMT United, Sisaket – 2017
 Nicolás Vélez – Suphanburi – 2017
 Raúl Gastón González – Sriracha – 2009

Armenia
 Edgar Manucharyan – Ratchaburi – 2017

Australia 
 Aleksandar Jovanović – BEC Tero Sasana – 2012
 Anthony Carter – Bangkok United – 2021
  Brandon O'Neill – Buriram United – 2020–2021
  Brent McGrath – Sisaket, Port – 2014–15
 Danny Invincibile – Army United – 2012–13
  Eli Babalj – Chainat Hornbill – 2019
  Erik Paartalu – Muangthong United – 2014
 Francesco Stella – Sisaket – 2015
 Goran Šubara – Bangkok Glass – 2013
 Henrique Andrade Silva – Chiangrai United – 2017
 Isaka Cernak – Sisaket – 2017
 Jesse Curran – Nakhon Ratchasima, Muangthong United – 2020–2021
 Kyle Nix – Chiangrai United – 2013
  Mark Bridge – Chiangrai United – 2016–17
  Matt Smith – Bangkok Glass – 2015–18
  Matt Thompson – PTT Rayong – 2014
  Michael Beauchamp – PTT Rayong – 2014
 Michael Cvetkovski – Navy – 2015
  Paul Reid – Police United – 2012
 Rocky Visconte – Suphanburi – 2013
 Trent McClenahan – PTT Rayong – 2014
 Jordan Murray – Nakhon Ratchasima – 2022–

Austria 
 Marco Sahanek – Nakhon Ratchasima – 2021
  Roland Linz – Muangthong United – 2013

Bahrain 
  Jaycee John Okwunwanne – Bangkok United, Air Force Central, Chonburi – 2015–18, 2019, 2020-2021

Belgium 
  Marvin Ogunjimi – Ratchaburi – 2016

Bolivia 
  Edivaldo Hermoza – Muangthong United – 2012–13
  Jhasmani Campos – Bangkok Glass – 2017
 Roland Vargas-Aguilera – TTM Phichit – 2010

Brazil

2007
 Ney Fabiano – Thailand Tobacco Monopoly, Chonburi, Bangkok Glass, Wuachon United, Suphanburi – 2007–08, 2010–13

2009
 Aron da Silva – Chula United, Sriracha, Songkhla United, Army United, Osotspa, Navy – 2009–2016
 Diego Pishinin – Sriracha – 2009, 2011
 Douglas Cobo – Chonburi, Sriracha, BEC Tero Sasana,  Khon Kaen United – 2009–11, 2021–2022
 Edvaldo – Thai Port, Chiangrai United – 2009–11
 Mario Caetano Neto– Chula United, BEC Tero Sasana – 2009–10
 Mário Da Silva – Thai Port, Bangkok United – 2009–13
 Paulo Roberto – Pattaya United – 2009
 Richard Falcão – PEA – 2009
 Valci Júnior – TOT, Sisaket, TTM Phichit, Thai Port – 2009–12

2010
 Diego – TTM Phichit, Navy – 2010–11
 Dudu – Buriram PEA, Sriracha, Osotspa Saraburi, Police United – 2010–12, 2014
 Anderson Dos Santos – Buriram United, Chonburi, Suphanburi  – 2010–16, 2018–2019
 Douglas – Buriram PEA, Ratchaburi, Saraburi – 2010, 2013–15
 Erikson Noguchipinto – Samut Songkhram – 2010–11, 2014
 Ricardinho – Pattaya United – 2010
 Chayene Santos – Muangthong United, Esan United – 2010, 2012
 Cleiton Silva – Osotspa Saraburi, BEC Tero Sasana, Muangthong United, Chiangrai United, Suphanburi – 2010–13, 2014–16, 2018–19, 2019-20

2011
 Diego Walsh – TOT – 2011–12
 Leandro Assumpção– Chiangrai United, Chonburi, Sisaket, Muangthong United, Air Force Central,  Nakhon Ratchasima, Suphanburi – 2011–2021
 Felipe Ferreira – Police United, Navy– 2011–13, 2016
 Alessandro Alves – Army United – 2011–14
 Antônio Cláudio – Chiangrai United – 2011–12
 Cristiano Lopes – Sriracha – 2011
 Leandro Dos Santos – Army United, Police United, Bangkok Glass – 2011–14
 Rafael – Buriram PEA, Bangkok Glass – 2011–12
 Uilian Souza – Chiangrai United – 2011–14
 Leonardo Ferreira – TTM Chiangmai, Chiangrai United – 2011–12
 Antonio Pina – Osotspa Samut Prakan, Pattaya United, Nakhon Ratchasima – 2011, 2016–18

2012
 Daniel Côrtes – Police United – 2012–13
 Victor Amaro – Samut Songkhram, Sisaket – 2012–2016
 Juninho – BBCU, TOT – 2012–13, 2015
 Léonardo – TTM Chiangmai, Chiangrai United – 2012–13
 Amaury Nunes – TOT – 2012
 Paulo Rangel – Muangthong United, Nakhon Ratchasima – 2012–13, 2017–18
 Vítor Huvos – Chainat Hornbill – 2011
 Tony Pinho – Army United, Bangkok United – 2012–13
 Thiago Cunha – Chonburi – 2012–15, 2017

2013
 Gabriel Dos Santos – BEC Tero Sasana – 2013
 Lucas Gaúcho – BEC Tero Sasana – 2013
 Vítor Huvos – Chainat Hornbill – 2013
 Jerri – Chiangrai United – 2013
 Wellington Katzor – Ratchaburi – 2013

2014
 Fernando Abreu – Chiangrai United – 2014–2015
 Raphael Botti – Army United – 2014–16
 Jeferson – Osotspa Samut Prakan – 2014–2016
 Fábio Lopes – Ratchaburi – 2014
 Luizinho – Suphanburi, Army United – 2014
 Lúcio Maranhão – Buriram United – 2014
 Renan Marques – Chiangrai United, Sukhothai, Chonburi, Air Force Central – 2014–2018
 Juliano Mineiro – Chonburi – 2014–15
 Leandro de Oliveira – Singhtarua, Bangkok Glass, Osotspa Samut Prakan – 2014–2015
 Márcio Rosário – Suphanburi – 2014–2016
 Wellington Priori – Army United, Pattaya United, Trat – 2014–15, 2017, 2020
 Leandro Tatu – Bangkok United – 2014–2016
 Renan Silva – Songkhla United, Chainat Hornbill – 2014, 2016
 Heberty – Ratchaburi, Muangthong United, Port, Bangkok United – 2014–15, 2017–

2015
 Diogo – Buriram United, BG Pathum United – 2015–18, 2020–
 Diogo Rangel – Osotspa Samut Prakan – 2015
 Gilberto Macena – Buriram United, Bangkok United – 2015–17
 Jandson – Buriram United, Chiangrai United – 2015, 2017
 Alex Wesley – Chainat Hornbill – 2015–16
 Rodrigo Vergilio – Navy, Chonburi , Chonburi– 2015–
 Vitor Júnior – Navy – 2015, 2018
 André Luís – Suphanburi, Navy, Suphanburi – 2015–18
 Wander Luiz – Ratchaburi – 2015
 Alex Medeiros – Army United – 2015
 Addison Alves – Osotspa Samut Prakan, Navy – 2015–
 Caihame – TOT – 2015
 Bruno Lopes – Ratchaburi – 2015
 Renatinho – Chiangrai United – 2015

2016

 Deivdy Reis  – Chainat Hornbill – 2016
 Dennis Murillo  – Chiangrai United, Osotspa, PTT Rayong, Nakhon Ratchasima, Chonburi – 2016, 2019-
 Wellington  – Chiangrai United – 2016
 Danilo Cirino – Chiangrai United – 2016
 Júnior Negrão – Pattaya United – 2016
 Tinga – Suphanburi – 2016
 Dellatorre– Suphanburi – 2016–2017, 2019
 Josimar – Army United, Port – 2016–2017, 2019
 Kaio Felipe – Buriram United – 2016
 Weslley Feitosa – Buriram United – 2016
 Carlos Santos – Ratchaburi – 2016–2017
 Rodrigo Frauches – Army United – 2016
 Alex Rafael – Sukhothai – 2016
 Chico – Sisaket – 2016

2017
 Jajá – Buriram United, Muangthong United, Chiangrai United – 2017–18, 2020
 Rogérinho – Buriram United – 2017
 Everton – Chiangrai United, Bangkok United – 2017–
 Felipe Azevedo – Chiangrai United – 2017
 Vander Luiz – Chiangrai United, Bangkok United – 2018–
 Célio – Muangthong United – 2017
 Tartá – Police Tero – 2017
 Denis Viana  – Sisaket – 2017
 Guilherme Moreira – Super Power Samut Prakan – 2017
 Diego Assis – Thai Honda Ladkrabang – 2017–
 Rafinha – Thai Honda Ladkrabang – 2017
 Ricardo Jesus – Thai Honda Ladkrabang – 2017–
 Tiago Chulapa – Ubon UMT United, Rayong, Police Tero – 2017, 2020, 2021
 Victor Cardozo – Ubon UMT United, Chiangrai United, PTT Rayong, BG Pathum United, Chiangrai United – 2017–
 Carlão – Ubon UMT United, Pattaya United, Samut Prakan City– 2017, 2019
 Thiago – Ubon UMT United  – 2017
 Rafael Bastos – Buriram United – 2017
 Rodrigo Maranhão – Sukhothai – 2017
 Elizeu – Suphanburi – 2017
 Gustavo Claudio – Thai Honda Ladkrabang – 2017
 Roninho – Thai Honda Ladkrabang – 2017
 Jonatan Reis – PT Prachuap, Suphanburi, Trat, Nongbua Pitchaya – 2017–2019, 2020-2021, 2022–

2018
 Robson – Bangkok United– 2018–2019
 Edgar – Buriram United – 2018
  Osvaldo – Buriram United – 2018
 Lukian – Pattaya United, Chonburi – 2018–2019
 Ciro – Chonburi – 2018
 Rafinha – Pattaya United – 2018
 Marcos Vinícius – Police Tero – 2018
 Douglas Tanque – Police Tero – 2018
 Bill – Ratchaburi, Chiangrai United – 2018–2022
 Felipe Menezes – Ratchaburi – 2018
 Rômulo – Suphanburi – 2018
 Rodrigo Paraná – Ubon UMT United – 2018
 Brinner – Ubon UMT United ,  Chiangrai United, Lampang – 2018–
 William Henrique - Chiangrai United, PT Prachuap, Suphanburi – 2018–2021, 2021–
 David Bala - Bangkok Glass, Chiangmai - 2018–19
 Matheus Alves - Chonburi, PT Prachuap, Police Tero- 2018-20

2019
 Dirceu - Ratchaburi - 2019
 Eliandro- Chiangmai, Suphanburi, Chonburi- 2019-2021
 Evson Patrício - Chiangmai, Chiangmai United- 2019, 2021–2022
 Ibson Melo - Samut Prakan City, Sukhothai,  Khon Kaen United - 2019-
 Ricardo Santos - Chainat Hornbill, Trat - 2019-2021
 Caíque - Chiangmai - 2019
 Júnior Lopes - Chonburi, Trat - 2019-2021
 Bruno Gallo - Muangthong United - 2019
 Derley - Muangthong United, Ratchaburi - 2019-
 Maurinho - PT Prachuap - 2019, 2022–
 Caion - PT Prachuap, Chonburi, Suphanburi - 2019-2021
 Pedro Júnior - Buriram United, Samut Prakan City - 2019, 2020

2020
 Ricardo Bueno - Buriram United - 2020 
 Brenner Marlos - Bangkok United - 2020 
 Barros Tardeli - BG Pathum United, Samut Prakan City, Nongbua Pitchaya – 2020–2021, 2021– 
 Mailson - Chiangrai United - 2020
 Willian Popp - Muangthong United - 2020-2022
 Lucas Rocha - Muangthong United - 2020-
 Tiago Luís - Rayong - 2020
 Evandro Paulista - Sukhothai, Police Tero- 2020, 2021–2022
 Felipe Amorim- Suphanburi, Chiangrai United- 2020-
 Alef - Suphanburi,Khon Kaen United  - 2020-
 Bruno Mezenga - PT Prachuap - 2020
 Willen Mota - PT Prachuap, Bangkok United - 2020-
 Danilo Lopes - Rayong - 2020
 Adalgisio Pitbull - Rayong - 2020
 Digão - Buriram United - 2020-2022
 Maicon - Buriram United – 2020–21
 Samuel Rosa - Buriram United, Samut Prakan City, PT Prachuap  – 2020–

2021
 Airton - Nongbua Pitchaya, Port - 2021–
 Hamilton Soares - Nongbua Pitchaya, Port  - 2021–
 Tauã - PT Prachuap - 2021-2022
 Danilo - Suphanburi, Chonburi - 2021–
 Getterson- Chiangrai United– 2021–2022
 Rômulo- Khon Kaen United– 2021–
 Rafael Jansen – Ratchaburi – 2021–

2022
 Cássio Scheid - BG Pathum United - 2022–
 Conrado - BG Pathum United - 2022–
 Diego Landis - Chiangrai United - 2022–
 Olávio - Chiangrai United - 2022–
 Andrey Coutinho - Lampang - 2022–
 Deyvison - Lampang - 2022–
 Thiago Mosquito - Lampang - 2022–
 Thales Lima - Lamphun Warriors - 2022–
 Jorge Fellipe - Nongbua Pitchaya - 2022–
 Negueba - Port - 2022–
 Danilo Oliveira - Police Tero - 2022–
 Laércio Soldá - Sukhothai - 2022–

Brunei Darussalam 
   Faiq Bolkiah - Chonburi FC - 2021–

Bulgaria 
 Lyuben Nikolov – Sisaket, Super Power Samut Prakan – 2015–17
 Gerasim Zakov – Sisaket – 2015

Burkina Faso 
 Valéry Sanou – Muangthong United, Sriracha – 2009

Cambodia 
  Khim Borey – Sisaket – 2011

Cameroon

2004
 Eric Kamdem Kamdem – BEC Tero Sasana – 2004

2006
 Jules Baga – Chonburi, Songkhla United, Chainat Hornbill – 2006–08, 2010–11, 2012–14

2007
 Michel Charlin Tcheumaleu – Osotspa, Samut Songkhram – 2007–09

2008
 Mballa Zambo – Samut Songkhram – 2008
 Bangnolac Jean Franklin – Port Authority, BEC Tero Sasana – 2008–09
 Eric Fotou Kamdem – BEC Tero Sasana – 2008
 Djanal Herve Pierre – Customs Department, Samut Songkhram, Bangkok Glass – 2008–09, 2012

2009
 Paul Ekollo – TTM Samut Sakhon, Bangkok Glass, Pattaya United, Bangkok United – 2009–13
 Moudourou Moise – Thai Port, Chainat Hornbill – 2009–10, 2012
 Ulrich Munze – Thai Port, Esan United – 2009–12

2010
 Njie Ngenevu Divine – Sisaket, Samut Songkhram, Suphanburi – 2010–14
 Berlin Ndebe-Nlome – Chonburi – 2010–11
 Ludovick Takam – Pattaya United, Chonburi, Police United – 2010–13

2011
 Clarence Bitang – Buriram PEA, Chainat Hornbill – 2011–12
 Yves Ekwalla Herman – Buriram United – 2011–12
 Florent Obama – Buriram PEA, Chainat Hornbill – 2011–13
 Franck Ohandza – Buriram PEA – 2011–12
 Theodore Yuyun – Osotspa Saraburi – 2011–12

2012
  Matthew Mbuta – Army United – 2012
 Valery Hiek – Bangkok Glass, Chainat Hornbill – 2012–14
 John Mary – Buriram United – 2012
 Yannick Ossok – Police United – 2012

2013
 Elvis Job – Songkhla United – 2013
 Christ Mbondi – Bangkok Glass – 2013
 Mbengono Yannick – Chainat Hornbill – 2013

2014
 William Modibo – Osotspa Saraburi – 2014

2015
 David Bayiha – Navy, Sukhothai– 2015–16

2016
Dooh Moukoko  – BBCU – 2016

2017
 Marcel Essombé – Ratchaburi – 2017

Canada 
  Dave Simpson – Chonburi – 2010
 Anthony Adur – TOT FC – 2010–2012

Central African Republic 
  Franklin Anzité – Samut Songkhram – 2014

Chile 
 Nelson San Martín – Bangkok Glass – 2009
 Ramsés Bustos – Buriram United, Super Power Samut Prakan – 2013, 2017

China 
 Li Xiang – Khonkaen – 2011

Colombia 
 Jhon Obregón – Ratchaburi – 2013
 Frank Castañeda – Buriram United – 2022–

Congo DR 
  Belux Bukasa Kasongo – BEC Tero Sasana – 2013–14
  Joël Sami – Ratchaburi, Sukhothai – 2017–18, 2019–2020
  Jonathan Bolingi – Buriram United - 2021–

Costa Rica 
 José Luis Cordero – Ratchaburi – 2013
  César Elizondo – Buriram United – 2013
  José Mena – Bangkok Glass – 2013–14
  Ariel Rodríguez – Bangkok Glass, PTT Rayong – 2016–17, 2018–19
  Diego Madrigal – Suphanburi – 2017

Croatia 
 Ante Rožić – Suphanburi – 2013
 Antun Palić – Bangkok United – 2014
 Aleksandar Kapisoda – Air Force Central – 2018
 Renato Kelić – Buriram United, Chonburi – 2020–

Curaçao 
  Shelton Martis – Osotspa Saraburi – 2014
  Prince Rajcomar – BEC Tero Sasana – 2015

Denmark 
 Henrik Jørgensen – Raj Pracha – 1996–97
 Sebastian Svärd – Songkhla United – 2014

Egypt 
 Islam Mohamed Zaky Sarhan – Thailand Tobacco Monopoly, Osotspa Saraburi – 2008, 2010

El Salvador 
  Christian Castillo – Suphanburi – 2013
  Nelson Bonilla – Sukhothai, Bangkok United, Port – 2018–2022
  Irvin Herrera – Sukhothai – 2019

England 
  Robbie Fowler – Muangthong United – 2011
 Chris Brandon – BEC Tero Sasana – 2011
 Romone Rose – Muangthong United – 2011
 Bas Savage – TOT – 2012–15
  Jay Bothroyd – Muangthong United – 2014
 Jay Simpson – Buriram United – 2014
 Rohan Ricketts – PTT Rayong – 2014
 Lee Tuck – Air Force Central, Nakhon Ratchasima – 2014–15
 Leroy Lita – Sisaket – 2017
 Jay Emmanuel-Thomas – PTT Rayong – 2019
 Adam Mitter – Rayong – 2020
 Charlie Clough – Nakhon Ratchasima – 2021–
 Morgan Ferrier – Nakhon Ratchasima – 2022–

Equatorial Guinea 
  Thierry Fidjeu – Singhtarua – 2014

Estonia 
  Henri Anier – Muangthong United – 2021–

Finland 
  Toni Kallio – Muangthong United – 2011

France 
 David Le Bras – BEC Tero Sasana, Chonburi – 2007–08
 Geoffrey Doumeng – Chonburi – 2011–12
 Christian Nadé – Samut Songkhram – 2011–13
 Flavien Michelini – Bangkok Glass, Ratchaburi – 2011–15
 Goran Jerković – Buriram United, Bangkok Glass, Army United – 2012–14
 Anthony Moura-Komenan – Osotspa Samut Prakan – 2012–2017
 Romain Gasmi – Bangkok United, Bangkok Glass – 2013–15, 2016
 Jonathan Béhé – BEC Tero Sasana – 2013
 Michaël Murcy – Police United, Chainat Hornbill – 2013–15
 Jonathan Matijas – Songkhla United – 2013
 Antonin Trilles – Bangkok United – 2013–14
 Michaël N'dri – Muangthong United, Police Tero – 2016–18
  Florent Sinama Pongolle – Chainat – 2016, 2018
 Yohan Tavares – Bangkok United – 2017
 Jean-Philippe Mendy – PT Prachuap – 2019
 Greg Houla – Police Tero – 2019–20
 Lossémy Karaboué – Ratchaburi, Suphanburi, PT Prachuap – 2019–
 Simon Dia – Police Tero,  Ratchaburi – 2019, 2020–2021
  Aly Cissokho – Lamphun Warriors – 2022–

Georgia 
 Giorgi Tsimakuridze – TOT, TTM Chiangmai, Bangkok Glass – 2010, 2012
 Zourab Tsiskaridze – Bangkok Glass – 2014

Germany 
 Sasa Disic – Pattaya United – 2009–10
 Björn Lindemann – Army United, Suphanburi, Nakhon Ratchasima, Navy, Sisaket – 2012–17
 Chinedu Ede – Bangkok United – 2017
 Richard Sukuta-Pasu - Police Tero - 2021

Ghana 
 Owusu Hayford – Nakhon Pathom – 2007–08
 Victor Mensah – PEA – 2008–09
 Evans Mensah – Osotspa – 2009–11
 Christian Egba – Osotspa Saraburi, Port – 2009–10
 Emmanuel Frimpong - Sisaket - 2010-11
  Frank Acheampong – Buriram United – 2011–13
  James Dissiramah – Sisaket – 2011
  Gilbert Koomson – BEC Tero Sasana, Samut Songkhram – 2012–15
 Issac Honey – BEC Tero Sasana, Samut Songkhram, Air Force Central, Police Tero – 2013–14, 2020-
  Dominic Adiyiah – Nakhon Ratchasima – 2015–18
 Prince Amponsah – Chonburi – 2016–2018
 Kwabena Appiah - Nakhon Ratchasima — 2021
 Lesley Ablorh - Police Tero — 2021–
 Kwame Karikari - Nakhon Ratchasima — 2021–22

Guadeloupe 
  Thomas Gamiette – BEC Tero Sasana – 2014

Guam 
  Brandon McDonald – Chainat Hornbill – 2015

Guinea 
  Aly Camara – Royal Thai Army, TTM Samut Sakhon – 2006–09
 Sylla Moussa – Royal Thai Army, Muangthong United, BBCU – 2006–12
  Lonsana Doumbouya – Prachuap, Trat, Buriram United – 2018–2019, 2022–

Guinea-Bissau
  Frédéric Mendy – Bangkok Glass – 2018
  Romário Baldé – Ratchaburi – 2022–

Haiti 
  Yves Desmarets – PTT Rayong – 2014
  Pascal Millien – Samut Songkhram – 2014

Honduras 
  Georgie Welcome – BEC Tero Sasana, Navy – 2014–15

Hungary 
 Norbert Csiki – Sisaket – 2016

Iceland 
  Sölvi Ottesen – Buriram United – 2017

Indonesia 
  Victor Igbonefo – Chiangrai United, Osotspa Samut Prakan, Navy, Nakhon Ratchasima, PTT Rayong– 2012, 2015–17, 2019
  Greg Nwokolo – Chiangrai United, BEC Tero Sasana – 2012, 2015–16
  Irfan Bachdim – Chonburi – 2013
  Sergio van Dijk – Suphanburi – 2014–15
  Terens Puhiri – Port – 2018
  Yanto Basna – Sukhothai, Prachuap– 2019–2021
  Todd Rivaldo Ferre – Lampang – 2021

Iran 
  Mohsen Bayatinia – Sisaket – 2015
  Mehrdad Pooladi – Bangkok United – 2017–18
 Mahan Rahmani – Nongbua Pitchaya – 2021

Iraq 
  Hussein Alaa Hussein – Bangkok United – 2013
  Rebin Sulaka – Buriram United – 2021–
  Frans Putros — Port — 2022–

Ireland 
  Niall Quinn – BEC Tero Sasana – 2004
 Billy Mehmet – Bangkok Glass – 2013
  Andy Keogh – Ratchaburi – 2015

Israel 
 Miki Siroshtein – Suphanburi – 2019
 Gidi Kanyuk – Buriram United, Nakhon Ratchasima, Chonburi – 2020-2022
 Lidor Cohen – Nongbua Pitchaya, BG Pathum United – 2021–

Ivory Coast

2003
 Mohamed Koné – Krung Thai Bank, Chonburi, Muangthong United, TOT – 2003–07, 2009–14

2004
  Kafoumba Coulibaly – Chonburi, BEC Tero Sasana – 2004–07

2005
 Hervé Kambou – BEC Tero Sasana – 2005–07
 Hamed Koné – Chonburi – 2005–09

2006
  Badra Ali Sangaré – Chonburi, BEC Tero Sasana – 2006–08
 Fodé Diakité – Chonburi, Pattaya United, BEC Tero Sasana – 2006, 2008, 2012–15, 2017
 Kassim Koné – Osotspa, Krung Thai Bank, Bangkok Glass – 2006–10
 Goore Landry Romeo – Chonburi, Thai Honda – 2006–07

2007
 Kignelman Athanase – Royal Thai Navy, Pattaya United – 2007, 2009
 Bireme Diouf – Samut Songkhram, Muangthong United, Chonburi, Suphanburi, Saraburi, Sukhothai, Chainat Hornbill, Trat – 2007–2009, 2010–2019
 Bamba Gaoussou – Suphanburi, Osotspa, BEC Tero Sasana – 2007–09

2008
 Jean-Baptiste Akassou – BEC Tero Sasana – 2008–09
 Kouadio Pascal – TOT, Buriram PEA, Esan United – 2008–10, 2012

2009
 Henri Jöel – Buriram PEA, Ratchaburi – 2009–10, 2013–15
 Dango Siaka – Muangthong United – 2009–14
 Yaya Soumahoro – Muangthong United – 2009–10
 Jacques Tioye – Bangkok United – 2009

2010
 Abdoul Coulibaly – Muangthong United – 2010
 Christian Kouakou – Muangthong United – 2010–12
 Koné Seydou – Buriram PEA, Songkhla United, Samut Songkhram – 2010, 2012–14

2011
 Diarra Ali – Muangthong United, Port, BBCU – 2011, 2015 – 2016

2013
 Marc Landry Babo – Samutsongkhram, Police Tero, Police Tero – 2013, 2020, 2022–

2014
 Kouassi Yao Hermann – Air Force Central – 2014
 Amadou Ouattara – PTT Rayong, Navy, Nakhon Ratchasima, Chonburi– 2014, 2018–

2015
 Bernard Doumbia – Saraburi, Chainat Hornbill, Nakhon Ratchasima – 2015, 2018-2019

2019
 Yannick Boli – Ratchaburi, Port, Chiangmai United – 2019–2022

Jamaica 
  Richard Langley – Pattaya United – 2010–11

Japan

2007
 Masahiro Fukasawa – Bangkok University, Bangkok United – 2007, 2010

2008
 Masao Kiba – Customs Department – 2008
 Ryuji Sueoka – Bangkok University – 2008

2009
 Yoshiaki Maruyama – Chonburi, Thai Port – 2009–10
 Hironori Saruta – Sriracha, Bangkok Glass, Port, Chiangrai United – 2009–2016

2010
 Takahiro Kawamura – Police United, TOT, BEC Tero Sasana – 2010–15, 2016
 Hiroshi Morita – Thai Port – 2010
 Isao Kubota – Samut Songkhram – 2010
 Keisuke Ogawa – Pattaya United, Chiangrai United – 2010–12, 2014
 Kunihiko Takizawa – Bangkok Glass – 2010–11
 Hiroyuki Yamamoto – TTM Phichit, Pattaya United – 2010–11
 Nobuyuki Zaizen – Muangthong United, BEC Tero Sasana – 2010–11

2011
 Yuya Iwadate – TTM Phichit – 2011
 Hiromichi Katano – Osotspa Saraburi, Sukhothai – 2011–14, 2016–17
 Kazuto Kushida – Chonburi, Chainat Hornbill – 2011–2016, 2020
 Kazuya Myodo – Pattaya United – 2011

2012
 Yusuke Kato – BEC Tero Sasana, Samut Songkhram – 2012, 2014 
 Ryuki Kozawa – Pattaya United – 2012
 Kai Hirano – Buriram United, Army United – 2013–14, 2015–2016
 Suguru Hashimoto – Osotspa Saraburi – 2013
 Shinnosuke Honda – Bangkok Glass – 2013
 Kazuki Murakami – Chiangrai United, Chainat Hornbill  – 2013–2016, 2019
 Sho Shimoji – BEC Tero Sasana, Chainat Hornbill – 2013–14, 2016

2014
  Daiki Iwamasa – BEC Tero Sasana – 2014
  Teruyuki Moniwa – Bangkok Glass – 2014
  Norihiro Nishi – Police United – 2014
 Robert Cullen – Suphanburi – 2014
 Hayato Hashimoto – Chonburi – 2014
 Yuji Funayama – Army United – 2014
 Genki Nagasato – Ratchaburi, Port – 2014–15, 2017
 Goshi Okubo – Bangkok Glass, Rayong – 2014–15, 2020–21
 Keita Sugimoto – Chiangrai United – 2014–15
 Yutaka Tahara – Samut Songkhram – 2014
 Terukazu Tanaka – Sisaket – 2014
 Yuki Bamba - Chonburi, Trat, BG Pathum United, Lampang - 2014, 2019–20, 2022–

2015
 Naoaki Aoyama – Muangthong United – 2015–18
 Jun Marques Davidson – Navy – 2015
 Satoshi Nagano – Nakhon Ratchasima – 2015–2016

2016
 Takuya Murayama – Ratchaburi – 2016
 Yukiya Sugita – Pattaya United – 2016

2017
 Jurato Ikeda – Bangkok Glass – 2017–
 Ryotaro Nakano – Chonburi – 2017
 Takafumi Akahoshi – Ratchaburi, Suphanburi – 2018–
 Yusei Ogasawara – Sisaket – 2017
 Tatsuro Inui – Thai Honda Ladkrabang – 2017
 Michitaka Akimoto – Thai Honda Ladkrabang – 2017
 Kenta Yamazaki – Ubon UMT United – 2017

2019
  Mike Havenaar - Bangkok United - 2019 
  Hajime Hosogai - Buriram United, Bangkok United - 2019-2021
 Ryutaro Karube - Chainat Hornbill, Suphanburi  - 2019-20

2020
 Yuto Ono - Samut Prakan City - 2020-2022
  Tatsuya Sakai - Samut Prakan City - 2020
 Mitsuru Maruoka - BG Pathum United - 2020-2021

2021
 Ryo Matsumura - BG Pathum United, Police Tero — 2021–2022
 Sergio Escudero - Chiangmai United — 2021–2022
 Daisuke Sakai - Samut Prakan City — 2021–2022
 Kohei Kato – Chiangrai United – 2021–2022
 Shintaro Shimizu – Nakhon Ratchasima – 2021–2022

2022
 Ryohei Arai - Sukhothai — 2022–

Jordan
  Rajaei Ayed – Ratchaburi – 2021–2022

Kenya
  Ayub Masika – Buriram United - 2021–
  Eric Johana Omondi – Muangthong United - 2022–

Kosovo
 Bajram Nebihi – Ubon UMT United, Chiangrai United, Chonburi – 2017–2018

Kyrgyzstan
 Anton Zemlianukhin – Sisaket, Sukhothai – 2016 –2017

Lebanon
  Soony Saad – Pattaya United, PT Prachuap – 2016, 2021–

Laos 
  Lamnao Singto – PEA – 2009
  Khampheng Sayavutthi – Khonkaen – 2011
  Kanlaya Sysomvang – Khonkaen – 2011
  Ketsada Souksavanh – Super Power Samut Prakan – 2017
  Soukaphone Vongchiengkham – Chainat Hornbill, Prachuap – 2019–20
  Outthilath Nammakhoth – Rayong – 2020
  Phoutthasay Khochalern – Samut Prakan – 2021

Lithuania 

  Nerijus Valskis – Ratchaburi – 2018

Madagascar 
  Guy Hubert – BEC Tero Sasana, Samut Songkhram, Saraburi – 2008–10, 2013–15
  Dimitri Carlos Zozimar – BEC Tero Sasana – 2009
  Jhon Baggio – Sukhothai– 2016–2021
  Njiva Rakotoharimalala – Sukhothai – 2018

Malaysia 
  Kiko Insa – Bangkok Glass – 2018
  Curran Singh Ferns – Sukhothai – 2018–2019
  Shahrel Fikri – Nakhon Ratchasima – 2018
  Dominic Tan – Trat, Police Tero – 2019–2021
  Norshahrul Idlan Talaha – BG Pathum United – 2020
  Mohamadou Sumareh – Police Tero – 2020
  Junior Eldstål – Chonburi – 2021-2022
 Safawi Rasid – Ratchaburi F.C. – 2023 
 Dion Cools – Buriram United F.C. – 2023

Mali 
  Kalifa Cissé – Bangkok United, Bangkok Glass, Police Tero – 2014–17
  Modibo Maïga – Buriram United - 2019

Martinique 
  Steeven Langil – Ratchaburi – 2019–2022

Montenegro 
  Đorđije Ćetković – Buriram United – 2012
  Marko Ćetković – Buriram United – 2012
 Dejan Vukadinović – Chainat Hornbill – 2012
  Dragan Bošković – Suphanburi, Bangkok United, Port, Chonburi, Police Tero – 2013–2019,2020–2021
 Bojan Božović – Chainat Hornbill – 2013
 Ivan Bošković – Chonburi, BEC Tero Sasana, Sisaket – 2013–14, 2015–16
  Radomir Đalović – BEC Tero Sasana – 2014
  Andrija Delibašić – Ratchaburi – 2014
  Nikola Nikezić – Chainat Hornbill – 2014
 Admir Adrović – Sukhothai – 2017
 Adnan Orahovac - Prachuap – 2018–2022
 Petar Orlandić –Sukhothai– 2019

Morocco 
  Alharbi El Jadeyaoui  – Ratchaburi – 2017

Myanmar
 Myo Hlaing Win – Singha-Thamrongthai – 1996
 Than Toe Aung – Singha-Thamrongthai – 1996
 Than Wai – Singha-Thamrongthai – 1996
 Aung Tan Tan – Port F.C. – 1996
 Kyaw Ko Ko – Chiangrai United, Samut Prakan City, Sukhothai– 2018–2020
 Nanda Lin Kyaw Chit – PT Prachuap – 2018
 Aung Thu – Police Tero, Muangthong United, Buriram United– 2018–2019, 2020-
 Thein Than Win – Ratchaburi Mitr Phol – 2019
 Zaw Min Tun – Chonburi, Sukhothai, Chonburi  – 2019–2021, 2022–
 Sithu Aung – Chonburi – 2019
  Aung Kaung Mann – Trat  – 2020
  Suan Lam Mang – Trat  – 2020
  Hlaing Bo Bo – Sukhothai – 2021–
  Maung Maung Lwin – Lamphun Warriors  – 2022–
  Hein Phyo Win – Ratchaburi Mitr Phol  – 2022–
  Myo Min Latt – Ratchaburi Mitr Phol  – 2022–

Namibia 
  Lazarus Kaimbi – Osotspa Saraburi, Bangkok Glass, Chiangrai United, Suphanburi – 2011–17
  Tangeni Shipahu – Osotspa Saraburi, Army United – 2012–15
  Sadney Urikhob – Saraburi, Super Power Samut Prakan, Police Tero – 2015–17

Netherlands 
 Randy Rustenberg – Pattaya United – 2011
 Adnan Barakat – Muangthong United, Army United, Songkhla United – 2012–14
 Mitchell Kappenberg – Chiangrai United – 2013
 Rutger Worm – Chiangrai United – 2013
 Melvin de Leeuw – Army United, Chiangmai United – 2015, 2021–2022
 Luciano Dompig – TOT – 2015
 Sylvano Comvalius – Suphanburi – 2018
 Leandro Resida – Chainat Hornbill, Rayong – 2019–2020
 Nacer Barazite- Buriram United - 2019

New Zealand 
  Kayne Vincent – Songkhla United, Buriram United, Port – 2014–15

Niger 
  Issoufou Boubacar Garba – Muangthong United – 2011
  Abdoul Aziz Hamza – BEC Tero Sasana – 2006–08

Nigeria 
 Jacob Aikhionbare – Thai Port, BBCU – 2008–12
 Samuel Ajayi – Bangkok Glass, Chonburi, Samut Songkhram – 2008–14
  Patrick Sunday – TTM Phichit – 2010
 Efe Jerry Obode – Pattaya United, Samut Songkhram – 2010–11, 2013
  Binawari Williams Ajuwa – BEC Tero Sasana – 2011
 Ekele Udojoh – BEC Tero Sasana – 2011
 O. J. Obatola – Pattaya United, Osotspa Samut Prakan, Sisaket – 2011–12, 2015
  Ikechukwu Kalu – Singhtarua – 2014
  Kelechi Osunwa – BEC Tero Sasana – 2014
 Adefolarin Durosinmi – Sisaket, Navy, Trat,  Chonburi – 2015–17, 2019–2021
 Marco Tagbajumi – Nakhon Ratchasima – 2016
 Raphael Success – Police Tero  – 2022–

North Korea 
  Ri Myong-jun – Thai Port – 2012
  Choe Kum-Chol – Muangthong United – 2012
  Pak Nam-chol – Muangthong United, Sisaket – 2013–14
  Ri Kwang-chon – Muangthong United – 2012–14

North Macedonia 
  Mario Gjurovski – Muangthong United, Bangkok United, Bangkok Glass, Muangthong United – 2012–2019
  Muzafer Ejupi – Songkhla United – 2014
  Baže Ilijoski – Bangkok Glass – 2014
  Borče Manevski – Chainat Hornbill – 2014
  Darko Tasevski – Bangkok Glass, Suphanburi – 2014–2016
  Krste Velkoski – Nakhon Ratchasima – 2017

Pakistan 
 Zesh Rehman – Muangthong United – 2011

Palestine 
 Jaka Ihbeisheh – Police Tero – 2017
 Matías Jadue – Port  – 2017
 Carlos Salom – Bangkok United – 2018–2019
 Yashir Islame – Khon Kaen United – 2021–2022
 Mahmoud Eid – Nongbua Pitchaya, Bangkok United – 2021–

Panama 
 Rolando Blackburn – Port – 2019

Paraguay 
 Aldo Barreto – BEC Tero Sasana – 2004–05
 Anggello Machuca – BEC Tero Sasana, Navy – 2010–11, 2015–16
 Javier Acuña – Ratchaburi – 2017

Philippines

2013
  Javier Patiño – Buriram United, Ratchaburi, Port – 2013–14, 2018–21

2018
  Michael Falkesgaard – Bangkok United – 2018–
  Mark Hartmann – Ubon UMT United, Ratchaburi, Suphanburi, Nakhon Ratchasima  – 2018–19
  Hikaru Minegishi – Pattaya United – 2018
 Chima Uzoka – Chainat Hornbill – 2018
  Luke Woodland – Buriram United, Suphanburi, Ratchaburi – 2018, 2020–21

2019
  Marco Casambre – Chainat Hornbill, Sukhothai – 2019, 2022–
  Patrick Deyto – Suphanburi, PT Prachuap – 2019–
  Curt Dizon – Chonburi, Ratchaburi – 2019, 2020–21
  Joshua Grommen – Sukhothai, Khon Kaen United – 2019, 2021-
  Ángel Guirado – Chonburi – 2019
  Kevin Ingreso – Buriram United, BG Pathum United, Samut Prakan City – 2019–2022
  Amin Nazari – Ratchaburi, PT Prachuap – 2019, 2022
  Manuel Ott – Ratchaburi – 2019
  Stephan Palla – Buriram United – 2019
  Iain Ramsay – Sukhothai, PT Prachuap, Nongbua Pitchaya, Lamphun Warriors– 2019–
  Adam Reed – Chainat Hornbill, Ratchaburi – 2019, 2022
  Daisuke Sato – Muangthong United, Suphanburi, Ratchaburi – 2019–2022
  Álvaro Silva – Suphanburi, BG Pathum United – 2019–21
  Martin Steuble – Port – 2019–21, 2022–

2020
  Amani Aguinaldo – Trat, Nongbua Pitchaya, Nakhon Ratchasima – 2020–
  Justin Baas – Ratchaburi  – 2020
  Jesse Curran – Nakhon Ratchasima, Muangthong United, BG Pathum United, Chonburi – 2020–2021, 2022–
  Carli de Murga – Chonburi – 2020
  OJ Porteria – Ratchaburi – 2020–21
  Patrick Reichelt – Suphanburi, PT Prachuap – 2020–22
  Dennis Villanueva – Nakhon Ratchasima, PT Prachuap – 2020–

2021
  Bernd Schipmann – Ratchaburi – 2021–22

2022
  Diego Bardanca – Buriram United, Chonburi – 2022–
  Dylan De Bruycker – Nakhon Ratchasima – 2022–
  Kike Linares – Lamphun Warrior – 2022–
  Jesper Nyholm – Muangthong United – 2022–

2023
  Kenshiro Daniels – Sukhothai

Poland 
 Łukasz Gikiewicz – Ratchaburi, BEC Tero Sasana – 2016

Portugal 
 Zezinando – Samut Songkhram, Air Force Central – 2011–12, 2014
 Jaime Bragança – Chonburi – 2014
  Yannick Djaló – Ratchaburi – 2016, 2018
 Bruno Moreira – Buriram United – 2016

Romania 
 Leontin Chițescu – Chiangrai United – 2011

Russia 
 Rod Dyachenko – Samut Songkhram, Pattaya United – 2011–14

Scotland 
 Stuart Kelly – Khonkaen – 2011
 Steven Robb – Thai Port – 2011–13
  Mark Burchill – Esan United – 2012

Senegal 
 Mohamed Moustapha N'diaye – Muangthong United – 2009

Serbia 
 Vladimir Ribić – Chonburi – 2011
 Zoran Rajović – BEC Tero Sasana – 2011
 Darko Rakočević – Chonburi, Songkhla United – 2011–14
 Rodoljub Paunović – TOT – 2012
  Miloš Bogunović – Bangkok United – 2013–14
 Žarko Jeličić – TOT – 2013
 Nikola Komazec – Suphanburi, Pattaya United F.C. – 2013, 2015
 Milan Bubalo – Muangthong United, Pattaya United F.C., BEC Tero Sasana  – 2014, 2015, 2016
 Marko Perović – Chainat Hornbill – 2014
 Predrag Sikimić – Singhtarua – 2014
 Bojan Beljić – BEC Tero Sasana – 2015
 Sreten Sretenović – BEC Tero Sasana – 2016
 Miloš Bosančić – BEC Tero Sasana – 2016
 Bojan Dubajić – Sisaket – 2016
 Miloš Stojanović – Pattaya United – 2017
  Andrija Kaluđerović – Port  – 2017
  Aleksandar Jevtić – Pattaya United – 2017
  Marko Šćepović – Buriram United – 2020
 Goran Čaušić — Buriram United — 2022–

Sierra Leone 
  Ishmail Kamara – Thai Honda – 2007
 Shaka Bangura – Samut Songkhram – 2013

Singapore 
  John Wilkinson – Police United – 2011
  Hassan Sunny – Army United – 2015–16
  Zulfahmi Arifin – Chonburi, Suphanburi – 2018,2020
  Gabriel Quak – Navy – 2018
  Baihakki Khaizan – Trat, Prachuap – 2019-2020
  Irfan Fandi – BG Pathum United – 2020–
  Izwan Mahbud – Trat, Samut Prakan City – 2020-2021
  Afiq Yunos – Trat – 2020
  Ikhsan Fandi – BG Pathum United – 2021-

Slovakia 
 Miroslav Tóth – TOT, Muangthong United – 2010–11
 Marián Juhás – TOT, Pattaya United – 2010–13
 Peter Ďurica – Sisaket – 2013
 Zdenko Kaprálik – Army United – 2014–15

Slovenia 
 Matej Rapnik – Police United – 2014
 Aris Zarifović – Samut Prakan City, Prachuap – 2019–

South Africa 
 Daniel Mbuizeo – Samut Songkhram – 2010

South Korea

2008
 Won Yoo-hyun – TTM Chiangmai – 2008–12

2010
 Jang Gil-hyeok – Siam Navy, Ratchaburi – 2010, 2013–14
 Jang Gil-yeong – Siam Navy, Bangkok United – 2010-11
 Kim Dae-kyung – Siam Navy – 2010
 Lee Ho-jin – Police United – 2010
 Lee Jung-yong – Sisaket – 2010

2011
 Jung Ho-jin – TTM Phichit, Sisaket, Samut Songkhram – 2011–13
 Lee Gwang-jae – TTM Phichit – 2011
 Shin Young-chol – Siam Navy – 2011
 Lee han-kuk - Police United, Samutsongkhram, TOT S.C. - 2011-2014
 Kim Dong-chan - PTT Rayong, Thai Port - 2011-2012

2012
  Park Jae-hong – Police United – 2012
 Park Jae-hyun – Samut Songkhram – 2012–13
 Jeon Kwang-jin – Chonburi – 2012
 Lee Dong-won – Chainat Hornbill – 2012
 Lee Jun-ki – TOT – 2012–15
 Kim Young-kwang – BBCU – 2012

2013
  Cho Jin-soo – Ratchaburi – 2013
 Bang Seung-hwan – Muangthong United, Air Force Central, Navy – 2013–14, 2017
 Han Jae-woong – Buriram United – 2013
 Jo Tae-keun – Chainat Hornbill – 2013–2016
 Jung Chul-woon – Pattaya United – 2013
 Jung Ji-soo – Pattaya United – 2013
 Jung Myung-oh – Army United, Suphanburi, Sukhothai – 2013–14, 2017–21
 Kim Tae-young – Esan United, Suphanburi, Songkhla United – 2013–14
 Kim Yoo-jin – Muangthong United, Bangkok United – 2013–14
 Kwon Jun – BEC Tero Sasana – 2013

2014
  Kim Dong-jin – Muangthong United – 2014–15
  Lee Sang-ho – Singhtarua – 2014
  Ko Ki-gu – TOT – 2014
 Gong Tae-ha – TOT – 2014
 Joo Sung-hwan – Singhtarua – 2014
 Kim Geun-chul – Singhtarua – 2014
 Kim Tae-min – Police United – 2014
 Kim Tae-yoon – Samut Songkhram – 2014
 Lee Hyun-jin – Chainat Hornbill, Army United – 2014
 Lee Soung-yong – PTT Rayong – 2014
 Lim Hyun-woo – Singhtarua – 2014
 Park Jung-soo – Chainat Hornbill – 2014–15

2015
  Cho Byung-kuk – Chonburi – 2015
  Son Dae-ho – BEC Tero Sasana – 2015
 Go Seul-ki – Buriram United, Port – 2015–17, 2019-2022
 Dai Min-Joo – Saraburi – 2015
 Lee Seung-hee – Suphanburi – 2015
 Lee Ho – Port – 2015

2016
  Kim Jin-kyu – Pattaya United – 2016 
  Kim Jung-woo – BEC Tero Sasana – 2016 
 Kim Chul-ho – Chonburi – 2016
 Kim Jong-pil – Chonburi – 2016 
 Jung Hoon – Suphanburi, PTT Rayong – 2016, 2018–2019 
 Woo Geun-jeong – BBCU – 2016
 Ma Sang-hoon – BBCU – 2016 
 Kim Seung-yong – Buriram United, Suphanburi – 2016
 Ahn Jae-hoon – Osotspa – 2016
 Yoo Jae-ho – Pattaya United – 2016

2017
  Lee Ho – Muangthong United – 2017-2019
 Kim Tae-yeon – Pattaya United, Samut Prakan City – 2017–2019
 Lee Won-young – Pattaya United – 2017
 Kim Dong-chan – Police Tero – 2017–
 Lee Keon-Pil – Super Power Samut Prakan – 2017

2018
  Lee Yong-rae – Chiangrai United – 2018–20
 Yoo Jun-soo – Buriram United, Ratchaburi Mitr Phol, Prachuap – 2018, 2019–20
 Park Jong-oh – Chainat Hornbill – 2018
 Kim Gyeong-min – Chonburi, Trat – 2018–2019
 Lee Won-jae – Nakhon Ratchasima – 2018–2019
 Lee Jeong-geun – Police Tero – 2018
 Kim Sung-hwan – Port, Suphanburi – 2018–2019
 Kwon Dae-hee – Prachuap, Police Tero, Prachuap – 2018,2020–2021,2022–
 Kang Soo-il – Ratchaburi , Trat – 2018–2019,2020

2019
  Park Hyun-beom – Chonburi – 2019
  Oh Ban-suk – Muangthong United – 2019
 Kim Ho-yeong – Samut Prakan City F.C. – 2019
 Kim Pyung-rae – Samut Prakan City F.C. – 2019–

2020
 Yoon Jun-sung – Nakhon Ratchasima – 2020
 Yeo Sung-hae – Ratchaburi, Sukhothai– 2020–2021
 Park Tae-hyeong – Rayong,  Nongbua Pitchaya – 2020, 2021
 Jung Jae-yong – Buriram United – 2020
 Lee Jae-sung – Ratchaburi – 2020–2021
 Bae Shin-young – Suphanburi – 2020

2021
 Cho Ji-hun – Chiangrai United – 2021–2022
 Jeong Woo-geun – Chiangmai United, Police Tero – 2021, 2022–
 Yoo Byung-soo – Chonburi – 2021–
 Jung Han-cheol – Suphanburi, Khon Kaen United – 2021–

2022
 Park Jun-Heong – Ratchaburi – 2022–
 Hwang Do-Yeon – Sukhothai – 2022–

Spain

2012
 José Pedrosa Galán – Chainat Hornbill – 2012
 Arzu – BEC Tero Sasana – 2012–13
 Regino – BEC Tero Sasana – 2012
 Osmar Ibáñez – Buriram United – 2012–13

2013
 Jesús Berrocal – Buriram United – 2013
 Bruno – Buriram United – 2013
 Juan Quero – Buriram United, Chonburi, Ratchaburi – 2013–14
 Carmelo González – Buriram United, Suphanburi – 2013–16

2014
 Albert Manteca – Sisaket – 2014
 Gorka Unda – Sisaket, Port, Chainat Hornbill – 2014–15, 2019–20
 Rafael Wellington – PTT Rayong – 2014
 Aritz Borda – Muangthong United – 2014
 Godwin Antwi – Sisaket – 2014
 Óscar Pérez – Ratchaburi – 2014
 Sergio Suárez – Police United, Port – 2014, 2017–
 David Rochela – Buriram United, Port – 2014–15, 2017–
 Rufo Sánchez – PTT Rayong – 2014

2015
 Aridane Santana – Bangkok Glass – 2015
 Toti – Bangkok Glass, BG Pathum United, Samut Prakan City – 2015–18, 2020-2021

2016
 Mario Abrante – Muangthong United, Police Tero – 2016–17
 Francisco González – Pattaya United – 2016
 Xisco Jiménez  – Muangthong United – 2016–2017

2021
 David Cuerva — Khon Kaen United — 2021

Sweden 
 Olof Hvidén-Watson – Osotspa Saraburi, Siam Navy, Thai Port – 2010–12
  Rasmus Jönsson – Buriram United – 2019
 Osman Sow – Sukhothai – 2022–
 Admir Bajrovic – Sukhothai – 2022–

Switzerland 
 Oumar Kondé – TOT – 2011
 Damian Bellón – Saraburi – 2015

Syria 
 Mohamad Al Hasan – Bangkok United – 2013
 Rafael Coelho – Chiangrai United – 2017
 Gilson Santos – Suphanburi – 2017
 Marcelo Xavier – Suphanburi – 2017
  Mohammed Osman – Lamphun Warriors – 2022–

Timor-Leste 
  Émerson – Chiangrai United – 2012

Trinidad & Tobago 
  Kendall Jagdeosingh – Chainat Hornbill – 2012–13
  Yohance Marshall – Chainat Hornbill – 2012
  Seon Power – Chainat Hornbill – 2013–14

Togo 
 Dosseh Attivi – Sisaket – 2010
  Thomas Dossevi – Chonburi – 2012
  Mawouna Amevor – Chonburi – 2019

Uganda 
 Arbade Bironze – Nakhon Pathom – 2007–09

Ukraine 
 Dmitriy Gorbushin – BEC Tero Sasana – 2015

United States 
 Jerome Watson – Raj Pracha – 1997
 Devala Gorrick – Pattaya United – 2010

Uzbekistan 
  Anvar Rajabov – Buriram United – 2012
 Asqar Jadigerov – Buriram United – 2012
  Artyom Filiposyan – Prachuap – 2019, 2020–21
  Sardor Mirzaev – Muangthong United – 2020-
  Akbar Ismatullaev – Buriram United – 2020

Venezuela 
  Andrés Túñez – Buriram United, BG Pathum United – 2015–
  Jeffren Suarez – Lamphun Warriors — 2022–

Vietnam 
  Lương Trung Tuấn – Port Authority – 2004–05
  Michal Nguyễn – Air Force Central – 2018
  Hoàng Vũ Samson – Buriram United – 2018
  Đặng Văn Lâm - Muangthong United - 2019–20
  Lương Xuân Trường - Buriram United - 2019

Wales 
 Michael Byrne – Nakhon Pathom, Chonburi, Bangkok Glass, Chainat Hornbill – 2009–13

Zambia 
  Noah Chivuta – Nakhon Ratchasima – 2015–2016

Zimbabwe 

  Mike Temwanjera – Bangkok United – 2014

References

Expatriate footballers in Thailand
Footballers in Thailand
Thai League 1 players
Thai Premier League
Association football player non-biographical articles